Geoffrey Thomas Taylour, 4th Marquess of Headfort DL, JP, FZS (12 June 1878 – 29 January 1943), styled Lord Geoffrey Taylour until 1893 and Earl of Bective between 1893 and 1894, was a British politician and Army officer.

Career
Styled Lord Geoffrey Taylour from birth, he was the son of Thomas Taylour, 3rd Marquess of Headfort, by his second wife Emily Constantia, daughter of the Reverend Lord John Thynne. He became known by the courtesy title Earl of Bective in 1893 on the death of his half-brother. The following year, aged 16, he succeeded his father in the marquessate.

Lord Headfort was commissioned a second lieutenant in the 1st Life Guards on 4 January 1899, and promoted to lieutenant on 7 March 1900. He resigned from the regiment in May 1901. In June the following year he was appointed a lieutenant in the newly created Yeomanry regiment, the 2nd County of London Yeomanry (Westminster Dragoons). He was justice of the peace and Deputy Lieutenant for county Meath, Ireland; and a Lieutenant in the Household Cavalry.

He was an English Freemason, having been initiated in the Lodge of Assistance No 2773 (London, England) at Golden Square, London, in February 1901, aged 22 years.

From 1922 to 1928, he served as a Senator of the Irish Free State.

Family
Rosie Boote, a young singer who appeared in The Messenger Boy in 1900 under her professional name of Miss Rosie Boote, so charmed the young Marquess that he married her on 11 April 1901. Their marriage was unusual: Rose was a Catholic from a humble background, while her husband was a Protestant aristocrat. He caused a sensation when he converted to Catholicism for their marriage. They lived at Headfort House in Ireland and had three children together:
 Terence Geoffrey Thomas, 5th Marquess of Headfort
 Lord William Desmond Taylour (1904–89), British archaeologist, known for his work in Mycenaean Greece. Born in Ireland and educated at Harrow School, after careers in banking and interior design in New York, and war service in North Africa, he studied archaeology and anthropology at Trinity College, Cambridge, before completing a PhD on Mycenaean pottery in Italy. His career as an excavator began in the 1950s. After the death of Alan John Bayard Wace in 1957, he took over and completed the British expedition to Mycenae. Taylour excavated at Hagios Stephanos in Laconia between 1959 and 1977.
 Lady Millicent Olivia Mary Taylour; married 28 April 1930 (div. 1936) to Henry Frederic Tiarks, a banker; they had one son, Christopher Henry Frederic (b. 13 March 1931 – died April 1932). Lady Millicent died 24 December 1975.

References

Work cited

External links

http://www.ascsa.edu.gr/index.php/archives/taylour-finding-aid
 

1878 births
1943 deaths
Members of the 1922 Seanad
Members of the 1925 Seanad
British Life Guards officers
Westminster Dragoons officers
British Army personnel of World War I
Deputy Lieutenants of Meath
Geoffrey
People educated at Harrow School
Marquesses of Headfort
Independent members of Seanad Éireann